Rainer Strohbach (born 17 April 1958) is a retired German swimmer. He competed at the 1976 and 1980 Summer Olympics in six freestyle events in total. He had his best results in the 4 × 200 m freestyle relay, finishing in fifth and second place, respectively. He won a bronze medal in this event at the 1977 European Aquatics Championships.

He was married to Kirsten Wenzel, a German rower who also competed at the 1980 Olympics.

References

1958 births
Living people
Swimmers from Dresden
People from Bezirk Dresden 
German male freestyle swimmers
Olympic swimmers of East Germany
Swimmers at the 1976 Summer Olympics
Swimmers at the 1980 Summer Olympics
Olympic silver medalists for East Germany
European Aquatics Championships medalists in swimming
Medalists at the 1980 Summer Olympics
Olympic silver medalists in swimming